Międzyrzec Podlaski  is a city in Biała Podlaska County, Lublin Voivodeship, Poland, with the population of 17,162 inhabitants . Międzyrzec is located near the Krzna river, not far from the border with Belarus.

History
The first official mention of Międzyrzec Podlaski as a town dates back to 1434, or (alternatively) 1455 and 1477 according to different historical sources. At that time, the newly established town was located along a busy merchant route from Lukow to Brzesc nad Bugiem. Międzyrzec quickly developed: in 1486, a Roman Catholic church was built here, and town's owner, Jan Nassutowicz, received permission for fairs. In 1598, a salt warehouse was opened, the town also was center of beer industry.

The period of peace and prosperity ended in 1648, when Miedzyrzec was raided by Zaporozhian Cossacks. During the Swedish invasion of Poland, the town was ransacked and burned by Swedes, who returned in 1706 and 1708, during the Great Northern War. Furthermore, Międzyrzec was raided by Russians in 1660.

In 1795, following the Partitions of Poland, the town was annexed by the Habsburg Empire. From 1809 until 1815, it belonged to the Duchy of Warsaw, and after Napoleonic Wars to Congress Poland under the control of the Russian Tsar. In 1867 it became a stop on the Polish railway system. By that time, Miedzyrzec was an important center of Greek Catholic Church: in 1772, Duke August Aleksander Czartoryski founded here Unite Church of St. Peter and Paul. Since mid-19th century, government of Russian-controlled Congress Poland initiated the process of Russification, aimed at the Uniates. As a result, two local Uniate churches were turned into Orthodox (1875).

Already since the 16th century Międzyrzec was home to a large Jewish community. At the end of the 1930s in the reborn Polish Republic approximately 12,000 inhabitants, or 75% of its population, were Jewish.

World War II

In 1939, during the Nazi–Soviet Invasion of Poland, the city was overrun by Wehrmacht on 13 September 1939, and ceded to the Russians on 25 September, in accordance with the Molotov–Ribbentrop Pact. Two weeks later, it was transferred back to Germany after the new Boundary Treaty. In 1940 six separate slave-labor camps were set up by the Nazis for some 2,000 local Jews; along with Judenrat, and the Jewish police.

The German army entered the Soviet occupation zone on 22 June 1941 under the codename Operation Barbarossa. More Jews from the surrounding area including expellees from Kraków were shipped in. Some 40 hostages were murdered on the streets. On 25–26 August 1942, the first mass deportation of Jews from Międzyrzec took place with around 10,000 prisoners forcibly put on 52 cattle cars (shipment #566 according to the German inventory) and sent to Treblinka extermination camp. Two days later, the Międzyrzec Podlaski Ghetto was established under the management of Judenrat. Several more mass deportation actions followed. On 17 July 1943, the ghetto was definitively liquidated, along with the local transit camp. Fewer than 1% of the Jewish population of the city survived the Nazi mass executions and deportations to death camps.

Economy
Of the approximately 4,900 employed citizens of the city, ca. 36% work in industrial fields, 19% in trade markets, and 11% in education. The unemployment rate in the city was 22% in October 2005.

The town lies at the intersection of two important national roads: DK2 (Poland's main east–west connector) and DK19. In the future Expressway S19 will run just west of the town.  A  section of it already constructed as the town's bypass road and opened in 2008 allows north–south traffic on DK19 road to avoid the town centre.

International relations

Twin towns and Sister cities
Międzyrzec Podlaski is twinned with:
 Thouars, France
 Kobryn, Belarus
 Malaryta, Belarus
 Pogiry, Lithuania 
 Ludza, Latvia
 Kamin-Kashyrskyi, Ukraine
 Petah Tikva, Israel

Notable people

 Jan Brożek
 Adam Kazimierz Czartoryski
 August Aleksander Czartoryski
 Konstanty Adam Czartoryski
 Yehoshua Leib Diskin
 Morris Michael Edelstein
 Judah David Eisenstein
 Stanisław Jan Jabłonowski
 Jacob ben Wolf Kranz
 Kazimierz Kierzkowski
 Ryszard Kornacki
 Sława Przybylska
 Moshe Rynecki
 Franciszek Stefaniuk
 Stanisław Żmijan
 Yitzhak Yaakov Wachtfogel (in Hebrew)
 Samson Zelig Rubinstein (Holocaust survivor buried in Wilmington, North Carolina)
 Rabbi Ephraim Eliezer Zvi Hersh Charlap (in Hebrew)

References

External links
 Międzyrzec Podlaski Home Page (in Polish)
 Portal of young people of Międzyrzec Podlaski
 Międzyrzec Podlaski Amateur Photography Board (in Polish)
 International Jewish Cemetery Project article (in English)
 Jewish Encyclopedia article (1906) (in English)
 Jewish Virtual Library article (in English)
 

Cities and towns in Lublin Voivodeship
Biała Podlaska County
Podlachian Voivodeship
Siedlce Governorate
Lublin Governorate
Lublin Voivodeship (1919–1939)
Shtetls
Holocaust locations in Poland